Horder may refer to:
Horder (sculptor), 12th-century Danish stonemason and sculptor 
Bill Horder (1929-2004), Australian rugby league footballer
Chris Horder (born 1976), Australian contemporary artist
Clarrie Horder (1890-1960), Australian pioneer rugby league player
Gwyneth Horder-Payton (born 1962), American television director
Harold Horder (1894–1978), Australian rugby league player, great-uncle of Wade
Jeremy Horder (born 1962), Professor of Criminal Law at LSE
John Horder (1919-2012), English general practitioner
Maurene Horder (born 1950), Australian politician
Max Horder (1923–1965), Australian rules footballer
Mervyn Horder, (1910–1997), composer and publisher
Percy Richard Morley Horder (1870-1944), English architect
Thomas Horder, 1st Baron Horder (1871–1955)
Wade Horder (born 1975), Australian rugby league player, great-nephew of Harold